Ehud Ben-Tovim is a former Israeli international footballer and widely regarded as the greatest talent that Bnei Yehuda Tel Aviv F.C. has ever produced. After a long period of distrust and angst between Bnei Yehuda and Ben-Tovim, he was appointed manager of the youth team in 2006.

Biography

Attempted move to Beitar Jerusalem
After the 1978–79 season, Ehud Ben-Tovim requested a raise from his boyhood club, Bnei Yehuda. After being denied the raise, he vented his frustrations with the Israeli media to which the club's chairmen replied that if he wanted to leave, he should pay IL700,000. After almost signing with Hapoel Be'er Sheva, Beitar Jerusalem stepped in and completed a deal with Bnei Yehuda within two days. When the transaction was complete, Bnei Yehuda fans protested in the streets of Tel Aviv, burning tires and stopping all public transportation. Riot police dispersed the crowd who renewed the protests the following day. Eventually, Ben-Tovim returned to Bnei Yehuda and Beitar received their money back.

References

1952 births
Living people
Israeli Jews
Israeli footballers
Association football forwards
Bnei Yehuda Tel Aviv F.C. players
Hapoel Rishon LeZion F.C. players
Israel international footballers
Israeli expatriate footballers
Oakland Stompers players
North American Soccer League (1968–1984) players
Expatriate soccer players in the United States
Israeli expatriate sportspeople in the United States
Israeli people of Yemeni-Jewish descent
Footballers from Tel Aviv
Olympic footballers of Israel
Footballers at the 1976 Summer Olympics
Israeli Football Hall of Fame inductees